Jacob Franklin James (July 9, 1817 - April 15, 1892) was an American politician who served as the second, as well as the seventh mayor of Manchester, New Hampshire.

First Election
James was the Whig candidate for mayor of Manchester, New Hampshire he was elected on May 22, 1847 and was sworn in on May 25, 1847. He was reelected in 1848. James served until his successor was sworn in as mayor on October 6, 1849.

Second Election
In 1857, as a result of a November 1856 election, James again became the mayor of Manchester.

Death
James died on April 15, 1892.

Notes

 

1892 deaths
New Hampshire Whigs
19th-century American politicians
Mayors of Manchester, New Hampshire
1817 births
Burials at Valley Cemetery